"Let Me Out" is a song by British alternative rock virtual band Gorillaz, featuring Pusha T and Mavis Staples. The song was released on 6 April 2017. It was released as the fifth single from their fifth studio album Humanz.

Background and recording
"Let Me Out" is the fifth single from the band's album Humanz and was produced by Damon Albarn, Remi Kabaka and the album's executive producer The Twilite Tone. The song features guest vocals from gospel singer Mavis Staples and rapper Pusha T. The song was written by Albarn, on a train journey, when conceptualising the album, Pusha T wrote his verse upon meeting Albarn and Gorillaz co-collaborator Jamie Hewlett in London. When speaking to Zane Lowe, who premiered the song on his Apple Music Beats 1 radio show, Pusha said "When I get over there, Damon begins to tell me to conceptualize the album as a party for the end of the world, like if Trump were to win. … I didn’t want to think about it, but that did give me a very colorful backdrop … I wrote from the perspective of this day … from the perspective of a Trump win."

Track listing
Digital release single
 "Let Me Out" – 2:56

Personnel
Damon Albarn – vocals, synthesizer
Pusha T – vocals
Mavis Staples – vocals
The Twilite Tone – synthesizer, additional vocals
Remi Kabaka Jr. – drum programming
John Davis – mastering engineer, engineering
Jonathan Lackey – assistant
Alex Baez – assistant
Samuel Egglenton – assistant
Stephen Sedgwick – engineering
Paul Bailey – additional engineering
The Humanz (Rasul A-Salaam, Starr Busby, Drea D'Nur, Giovanni James, Marcus Anthony Johnson, Janelle Kroll, Brandon Markell-Holmes, Imani Vonshà) – additional vocals

Charts

References

2017 songs
2017 singles
Gorillaz songs
Pusha T songs
Gospel songs
Songs written by Damon Albarn
Songs written by Pusha T
Parlophone singles
Warner Records singles